École polytechnique de l'université d'Angers (Polytech Angers, formerly Institut des sciences et techniques de l'ingénieur) is a French engineering College created in 1991.

The school trains engineers in four majors:

 Building and security
 Biological engineering and health
 Quality, innovation, reliability
 Automated Systems and Computer Engineering

Located in Angers, Polytech Angers is a public higher education institution. The school is a member of the University of Angers.

References

External links
 Polytech Angers

Engineering universities and colleges in France
Polytech Angers
Angers
Educational institutions established in 1991
1991 establishments in France